Grace Schulman (born Grace Jan Waldman, 1935, New York City) is an American poet. She received the 2016 Frost Medal for Distinguished Lifetime Achievement in American Poetry, awarded by the Poetry Society of America. In 2019, she was inducted as member of the American Academy of Arts and Letters.

Biography
Schulman studied at Bard College, and graduated from American University in 1955, and from New York University with a Ph.D. in 1971.

She is Distinguished Professor of English at Baruch College, City University of New York (CUNY), and has taught poetry writing at Princeton University, Columbia University, Wesleyan University, Bennington College, and Warren Wilson College. Schulman's eighth collection of poems is "The Marble Bed" (Turtlepoint Press, 2020). Her seventh is Without a Claim (Mariner, Houghton Mifflin Harcourt, 2013). Her memoir is Strange Paradise: Portrait of a Marriage (Turtle Point Press, 2018). Her collection of essays is First Loves and Other Adventures (U of Michigan Press, 2010). She is the author of Days of Wonder: New and Selected Poems, which was selected by Library Journal as one of the “best poetry books of 2002," and was a finalist for the Phi Beta Kappa Award of that year. Wallace Shawn wrote of her poems, "When I read her, she makes me want to live to be four hundred years old, because she makes me feel there is so much out there, and it's unbearable to miss any of it," and Harold Bloom wrote of The Paintings of Our Lives: "These elegiac lyrics are reveries upon art, street scenes, and the beloved dead. Many of them are so exquisite in their sensibility, so intricate in their texture, that they are likely to endure as long as we have discerning readers." The American Scholar selected her poem "Headstones" as Best Poem of 2004. Schulman's other honors include the Aiken Taylor Award for Poetry; the Delmore Schwartz Memorial Award; a Guggenheim Fellowship; five Pushcart Prizes; New York University's Distinguished Alumni Award; and a Fellowship from the New York Council on the Arts. Her poems have appeared in anthologies such as Best American Poetry (1995), Best of the Best American Poetry 1989–99 (1999), and American Religious Poems (2006). Her poetry is described by Mary Ann Caws in "Grace Schulman's Seeing," from In the Frame: Women's Ekphrastic Poetry, edited by Jane Hedley (U of Delaware Press); and by David Mason, in "Grace Schulman's Songs of Praise", Sewanee Review.

Her work has appeared in the New Yorker, the New Republic, Paris Review, Antaeus, Grand Street, the Yale Review, the Hudson Review, Atlantic Monthly, and the Kenyon Review.

Editor of The Poems of Marianne Moore (Viking Penguin 2003), from 1972 to 2006 Schulman served as Poetry Editor of The Nation, where she published poems by Octavio Paz, W. S. Merwin, and May Swenson, and from 1973 to 1985 as director of the Poetry Center, 92nd Street Y, where she founded a contest then called "Discovery—The Nation."

Personal life
She married a scientist, Jerome L. Schulman, M. D., in 1959. The marriage lasted 57 years, until his death in 2016. She lives in New York City and East Hampton.

Awards
 Induction as Member, American Academy of Arts and Letters, 2019
 Frost Medal for Distinguished Lifetime Achievement in American Poetry, 2016
 Guggenheim Fellowship for Poetry, 2004–2005
 Aiken Taylor Award for Poetry, 2003
 Five Pushcart Prizes (Poetry), 21, 23, 27, 32, 46.
 Distinguished Alumni Award, New York University Graduate Arts and Sciences, 2003
 Finalist, Phi Beta Kappa Awards, 2002.
 Delmore Schwartz Award for Poetry, 1996.
 Poetry Fellowship from the New York Foundation of the Arts, 1995.
 "Best Poem of 2004," American Scholar.

Works

Poetry

 
 
 
 For That Day Only Sheep Meadow Press (Riverdale-on-Hudson, NY), 1994.
 Hemispheres Sheep Meadow Press (New York, NY), 1984.
 Burn Down the Icons. Princeton University Press (Princeton, NJ), 1976.

Memoir

Editor
 
 Grace Schulman, ed. Mourning Songs: Poems of Sorrow and Beauty. New Directions 2019,

Criticism

Translator
 T. Carmi, At the Stone of Losses (poems), University of California Press (Berkeley, CA), 1983.

Anthologies
 The Best American Poetry 1995, edited by David Lehman and Richard Howard.
 The Best of the Best American Poetry 1988–1998, edited by David Lehman and Harold Bloom.
 Pushcart Prizes 21, 23, 27, and 32.
 American Religious Poems, edited by Harold Bloom and Jesse Zuba.
 I Speak of the City, edited by Stephen Wolf.
 The Poetry Anthology,1912–2002, edited by Jospeph Parisi and Stephen Young.
 Hammer and Blaze: A Gathering of Contemporary Poets, edited by Ellen Bryant Voigt and Heather McHugh.

References

3 and 4, The Paris Review, "American Solitude," "The Paintings of Our Lives," Young Woman Drawing," "Margaret Fuller."
The New Yorker: "Notes from Underground: W. H. Auden on the IRT," "East as Wind."

External links
 Grace Schulman Papers. Yale Collection of American Literature, Beinecke Rare Book and Manuscript Library.

1935 births
Living people
Writers from New York City
Bard College alumni
American University alumni
New York University alumni
Wesleyan University faculty
Baruch College faculty
American women poets
American women academics
21st-century American women
Members of the American Academy of Arts and Letters